Itanagar is one of the 60 assembly constituencies of  Arunachal Pradesh a north east state of India. It is also part of Arunachal West Lok Sabha constituency.

Members of Legislative Assembly
 1990: Lichi Legi, Janata Dal
 1995: Lechi Legi, Indian National Congress
 1999: Lechi Legi, Indian National Congress
 2004: Shri Kipa Babu, Bharatiya Janata Party
 2009: Techi Kaso, Nationalist Congress Party
 2014: Techi Kaso, Indian National Congress

Election results

2019

See also

 Itanagar
 Papum Pare district
 List of constituencies of Arunachal Pradesh Legislative Assembly

References

Assembly constituencies of Arunachal Pradesh
Papum Pare district
Itanagar